Pietro Giubilo (born 29 August 1942) is an Italian Christian Democrat politician. On 27 February 2014 he was appointed Knight Grand Cross of the Order of Merit of the Italian Republic.

References

External links

1942 births
Living people
Christian Democracy (Italy) politicians
Union of the Centre (2002) politicians
Mayors of Rome
Knights Grand Cross of the Order of Merit of the Italian Republic